Tenacity may refer to:
 Tenacity (psychology), having persistence in purpose
 Tenacity (mineralogy) a mineral's resistance to breaking or deformation 
 Tenacity (herbicide), a brand name for a selective herbicide
 Tenacity (textile strength)
 Tenacity (audio editor), an Audacity fork
 Tenacity (non-profit), an organization founded by Ned Eames
 Dream Chaser Tenacity, a spacecraft

See also
 Tenacity on the Tasman, a 2009 documentary film
 W.T.F. (Wisdom, Tenacity and Focus), 2011 studio album by Vanilla Ice
 Sectility, a form of tenacity (mineralogy)